Richard Lee  was an English politician who sat in the House of Commons of England  from 1640 to 1648.

Early life 
Lee was from a family of Rochester and in 1621 became one of the bridge wardens of Rochester Bridge, a post he held until 1653.

Career 
In April 1640, Lee was elected Member of Parliament for Rochester for the Short Parliament. He was re-elected MP for Rochester in November 1640 for the Long Parliament where he sat until he was excluded under Pride's Purge in 1648. Lee was mayor of Rochester in 1643 when he was also appointed a commissioner for Kent to oversee the speedy raising and levying of money for the relief of the Commonwealth.

See also 

 List of MPs elected to the English parliament in November 1640

References

Year of birth missing
Year of death missing
Mayors of places in Kent
English MPs 1640 (April)
English MPs 1640–1648